Gabrielle Alioth (born 21 April 1955) is a Swiss author of novels, short stories, children's books and travelogues, resident in Ireland since 1984.

Biography

Gabrielle Alioth was born on 21 April 1955 in Basel and grew up in Riehen; she went on to study political science, economics, art history and philosophy in Basel and Salzburg Universities. In 1979 she began working in the University of Basel and as a researcher at Prognos AG in econometric forecasting and Operations Research.

Alioth moved with her husband, Martin Alioth (divorced in 2015), to Ireland in 1984, where she worked as a journalist and translator. From 1990 Alioth began working as a freelance writer. Since 2011 she lives in Termonfeckin, County Louth.

In 1991 she took part in the Ingeborg Bachmann Competition in Klagenfurt, and the same year was awarded the Mara Cassens Prize. 2012 Geertje Potash-Suhr Prose Prize. In 2020 she was awarded the Cultural Prize of Riehen. 2022 SCALG Poetry Prize. Alioth is a member of the Association of Authors of Switzerland and president of the PEN Center of German-Speaking Authors Abroad.

She has been writer-in-residence at the University of Southern California in 1997 and University College Dublin in 2005, and later on Achill Island, County Mayo, Ireland. Alioth has also been guest lecturer at the Case Western Reserve University in Cleveland in 2002 and at the University of St. Gallen in 2016, and worked as a lecturer at the Lucerne University of Applied Sciences and Arts from 2004 to 2021.

Bibliography

Novels and stories

 Der Narr. Nagel & Kimche, Zürich 1990
 Wie ein kostbarer Stein. Nagel & Kimche, Zürich 1994
 Die Arche der Frauen. Nagel & Kimche Zürich 1996
 Die stumme Reiterin. Nagel & Kimche, Zürich 1998
 Das magische Licht. Nagel & Kimche, Zürich 2001
 Im Tal der Schatten. Nagel & Kimche, Zürich 2002
 Die Erfindung von Liebe und Tod. Nagel & Kimche, Zürich 2003
 Der prüfende Blick. Nagel & Kimche, Zürich 2007
 Die Braut aus Byzanz. Nagel & Kimche, Zürich 2008
 Die griechische Kaiserin. Nagel & Kimche, Zürich 2011
 Die entwendete Handschrift. Lenos, Basel 2016
 Die Frau aus Theben. Schweizerisches Jugendschriftenwerk, Zürich 2016
 Tell – mein Vater. Schweizerisches Jugendschriftenwerk, Zürich 2018
 Gallus der Fremde. Lenos, Basel 2018
 In der Bibliothek des Bären. Schweizerisches Jugendschriftenwerk, Zürich 2019
 Die Überlebenden. Lenos, Basel 2021
 Seapoint – Strand. Caracol, Warth 2022

Poetry 
 The Poet's Coat - The poet's coat, 2019

Nonfiction 
 Shared - 24 life stories of women from Basel-Stadt and Basel-Landschaft, 2008
 Emigrants - Swiss emigrants from 7 centuries, 2014

Travel books
 Ireland. A journey through the land of the rainbow, 2003
 Ireland, with Northern Ireland. Photos by Max Schmid, 2004
 Ireland. Photos by Marco Paoluzzo, 2007
 Ireland at second glance. An island in thirty texts , 2012

Plays
 Ärger uf de Arche, 2006
 Orpheus!

References and sources

1955 births
Living people
21st-century Swiss women writers
University of Basel alumni
20th-century Swiss journalists
People from Riehen
People from County Louth